Fore Play is a 1975 comedy anthology film co-directed by Bruce Malmuth, Robert McCarty, Ralph Rosenblum, and future Academy Award-winner John G. Avildsen.

Plot
Within a frame story in which a doctor talks about sex, the film is split into three segments: the first involves a man buying an animate sex doll and his many failed attempts to bed it. In the second story, a man suffering from writer's block finds his muse by undressing various women. Finally, the third story involves the President of the United States, whose daughter is kidnapped and will be killed unless the president and his wife have sex on national television.

Cast
 Zero Mostel as President/Don Pasquale
 Estelle Parsons as 1st Lady/Barmaid
 Pat Paulsen as Norman
 Jerry Orbach as Jerry Lorsey
 George S. Irving as Reverend/Muse
 Carmen Álvarez as Anytime Annie
 Fred Baur as Secret Service/Mafia
 Irwin Corey as Professor Irwin Corey
 Thayer David as General
 Paul Dooley as Salesman
 Andrew Duncan as Hurdlemeyer
 Laurie Heineman as Trixie
 Deborah Loomis as Waldo
 George King as Masseur
 Tom McDermott as Chief Justice McDonald
 Louisa Moritz as Lt. Sylvia Arliss
 Shelley Plimpton as First Girl

Production
The film was originally made up of four segments (hence the title of the film), but the last segment was ultimately cut from the final draft of the script. The frame story, "Professor Corey on Sex", is a parody of a "white coater" sex education film and was written by Jack Richardson and directed by Ralph Rosenblum. The first segment, "Norman and the Polish Doll", was written by Dan Greenburg and directed by Robert McCarty. The second segment, "Vortex", is written by Jack Richardson and Bruce Jay Friedman and directed by Bruce Malmuth. The final segment, "Inaugural Ball", was written by David Odell and directed by John G. Avildsen.

Release
The film is currently being distributed by Troma Entertainment.

See also
 List of American films of 1975

External links

1975 films
1975 comedy films
1970s sex comedy films
American anthology films
American comedy films
American independent films
American sex comedy films
1970s English-language films
Films directed by Bruce Malmuth
Films directed by John G. Avildsen
Films directed by Ralph Rosenblum
Films with screenplays by Bruce Jay Friedman
Troma Entertainment films
Films with screenplays by David Odell
1970s American films